Brocket 99: Rockin' the Country is a Canadian documentary film directed by Nilesh Patel, which examined the ongoing popularity of Brocket 99, a controversial radio comedy tape based on stereotypes of Canadian First Nations people.

CBC Radio's Sounds Like Canada described Brocket 99 as:

It started as a fake radio show on a cassette. Then it developed a cult following. Brocket 99 is something of a cultural phenomenon in western Canada. It purports to be a radio program on an Indian reserve. Some people find it hilarious and racey. Others say it's outright racist.

In 2006, the film won the Séquences Magazine Prize in the documentary category at the Montreal First Peoples' Festival and the Special Recognition Award at the Anchorage International Film Festival. The film was also featured at the 2006 Calgary and Edmonton International Film Festivals and the Vancouver Asian Film Festival.

References

External links 

2006 films
Canadian documentary films
Documentary films about First Nations
Documentary films about racism in Canada
Anti-Indigenous racism in Canada
Documentary films about comedy and comedians
2006 documentary films
2000s English-language films
2000s Canadian films